John Lester (1871–1969) was an American cricketer.

John Lester may also refer to:
John Lester (footballer) (born 1982), Irish footballer
John Lester (showman) (1867–1950), American showman
John Angelo Lester (1858–1934), American educator, physician and administrator
John Lester, one of the "Immortal Six" founders of the Ku Klux Klan

See also
Jack Lester (disambiguation)
Jon Lester (born 1984), American baseball pitcher
Jon Leicester (born 1979), American former baseball pitcher